Three Fourths Home is a game developed by Bracket Games, released on 20 March 2015.

Plot

The game follows the struggles of one family. The protagonist, named Kelly, is driving through rural Nebraska when her mother calls, sparking a conversation that will change the upcoming events.

Gameplay

The game is a visual novel. The player can make conversation choices that will change the relationships between the family members.

Development

The game was a finalist for the Best Narrative IGF Award. A special extended edition of the game will be released with a section taking place in Minnesota. The game was released in 2015.

It was released on Steam on 20 March 2015.

Reception

Three Fourths Home received mostly positive reviews. It has a score of 77% for the PC version on Metacritic.  The Extended Edition was also released for PS4, PS Vita, and Xbox One to varied scores. While the PS Vita version received a score of 84%, the Xbox One version received a score of 64% based on critics that reviewed those versions.  The PS4 version currently does not have enough reviews to offer a Metacritic score.

Gamespresso awarded it a score of five out of five, saying that it "challenges what a game is". Technology Tell said that the game was "effective in every way". GameSkinny said that it should be a contender for the Game of the Year Award. GameSpot awarded it a score of 8.0 out of 10, saying "More than anything, though, Three Fourths Home reminded me of one of those nights where you look down to see that you're going ten… twenty… thirty miles over the speed limit."

References

2015 video games
Indie video games
Linux games
MacOS games
PlayStation 4 games
PlayStation Vita games
Visual novels
Video games developed in the United States
Windows games
Xbox One games